Sharon Horne is a scientist known for conducting research on LGBTQ issues, mental health and college student development, and international psychology concerns. Horne is Professor of Counseling Psychology and the Director of Training for the American Psychological Association Accredited Counseling Psychology Ph.D. Program at the University of Massachusetts Boston. She is a representative to the APA International Psychology Network for Lesbian, Gay, Bisexual, Transgender and Intersex Issues (IPsyNet), and chaired the policy committee that drafted the IpsyNet Statement and Commitment on LGBTI Concerns.

Sharon Horne is also in the progress of writing her own memoir, Memphis Baby: Overcoming reproductive injustice in the U.S. South.

Biography 
Horne started her undergraduate career in 1983 and received her dual Bachelor of Arts in Slavic Languages and Literature, and Journalism from Indiana University in 1987. She also received a Certificate of Study in Slavic and Eastern European studies from Indiana University. Horne then attended the Pushkin Institute for a year in Moscow, Russia, where she studied Russian language. She then did post-graduate teacher training at the Peace Corps Training Center in Niger, West Africa, from 1988 to 1990. She attended graduate school at the University of Georgia, where she received her master's degree in Counseling in 1994 and a Ph.D. in Counseling Psychology in 1998.

From 1994 to 1997, Horne was a Research Assistant for The Adolescent Development Research Program, at the Institute of Behavioral Research at the University of Georgia. She worked under the Supervision of director Gene Brody, Ph.D. Horne dealt with Data management, program facilitation, family interviewing, and analysis for longitudinal study utilizing a random sample of 232 Georgia families. She studied adolescent alcohol norms as well as family, teacher, and peer processes.

Soon after, she interned for a pre doctoral, APA-Approved veterans affair administration in Seattle.

Key research collaborators include Jeanmarie Keim and Heidi M. Levitt. Horne spent time researching vicarious trauma with Keim and researched domestic violence with Levitt both at The University of Memphis.

Research 
Since 1999, Horne serves as a director of the Gay, Lesbian, Bisexual, and Transgender Issues Research Team with Heidi Levitt and David Panatlone. She directs a team of doctoral, masters, and undergraduate students in research, advocacy, and training in GLBTQI health issues. Her team projects have included developing a training program for school professionals to increase competencies in working with GLBT and queer youth, a training video, and a research study on GLB youth experiences. Horne's research team additionally studies investigating experiences of religion and spirituality among GLBT adults, studies on same-sex relationships for men and women, the psychological impact of anti-GLBT messages and anti-GLBT policy initiatives on GLBT individuals, parents, and families of origin, GLBT HIV health related issues, racial and sexual minority for gay families, and the psychological impact of lack of legal rights for LGBT parents. This is Horne's main area of research.

In addition, her past research includes that she was the co-director of her Domestic Violence Research Team at the University of Memphis, where she co-facilitated a research team of five graduate students from 2001 to 2004, and produced both qualitative and quantitative publications and presentations. In 2001, Horne was also the co-director of the Vicarious Trauma Research Team also at the University of Memphis where she co-led her team on secondary PTSD, which resulted in national presentations and several publications. From 1994 to 1997, Horne was a graduate research assistant part of The Adolescent Development Research Program at the University of Georgia where she managed data, facilitated programs, interviewed families, analyzed longitudinal studies and utilized a random sample of 232 Georgia families. She researched adolescent alcohol norms as well as family, teacher, and peer processes.

In one of Horne's study examining legal recognition of same-sex couple relationships, she found that participants in committed or legally recognized relationships reported less psychological distress and higher well-being than single participants. She used an online survey sample of 2,677 lesbian, gay, and bisexual individuals, and participants were placed in 4 groups: single, dating, in a committed relationship, and in a legally recognized relationship. Analyses revealed that Significant group differences and multivariate analyses indicated that participants in a legally recognized relationship reported less internalized homophobia, fewer depressive symptoms, lower levels of stress, and more meaning in their lives than those in committed relationships, even after controlling for other factors.

Another study examined a survey of lesbian, gay, and bisexual adults who experienced minority and psychological distress following the 2006 general election in which the constitutional amendments were on the ballot in 9 states limiting marriage to one man and one woman. Following the November election, Horne found that participants living in states that passed a marriage amendment reported significantly more minority stress (i.e., exposure to negative media messages and negative conversations) and higher levels of psychological distress (negative affect, stress, and depressive symptoms) than participants living in the other states.

Awards and honors 
Horne has received awards for her contributions and research in psychology including the 2012 Elizabeth Hurlock Beckman award. This award recognizes teachers who inspire students to make a difference in their own communities. In 2013, Horne received the Excellent Contribution Award for Scholarship in the Area of International Counseling Psychology, granted by the Society of Counseling Psychology International Section, and received the Florence L. Denmark and Benjamin Wolman Award for Significant Contributions in Psychology awarded by The International Organization for the Study of Group Tensions and the Academic Division of the New York State Psychological Association. In 2016, she received the Award for Significant Contribution to Social Justice & Advocacy from the Society of Counseling Psychology of the American Psychological Association. Horne was named Honorary Professor for 2016–2017 at the American University of Central Asia where she gave the commencement address in Bishkek, Kyrgyzstan.

Additionally, Horne is the recipient of a Fulbright Scholarship for 2018–2019 on the role of psychology policies and guidelines on mental health access and treatment of sexually and gender diverse individuals in Colombia, South Africa and the Philippines. In 2020, Horne received the APA Award for Distinguished Contributions to the International Advancement of Psychology.

Representative publications 
 Riggle, E. D., Rostosky, S. S., & Horne, S. G. (2010). Psychological distress, well-being, and legal recognition in same-sex couple relationships. Journal of Family Psychology, 24(1), 82.
 Rostosky, S. S., Riggle, E. D., Horne, S. G., & Miller, A. D. (2009). Marriage amendments and psychological distress in lesbian, gay, and bisexual (LGB) adults. Journal of Counseling Psychology, 56(1), 56.
 Lease, S. H., Horne, S. G., & Noffsinger-Frazier, N. (2005). Affirming Faith Experiences and Psychological Health for Caucasian Lesbian, Gay, and Bisexual Individuals. Journal of counseling psychology, 52(3), 378.
 Rose, D., Horne, S., Rose, J. L., & Hastings, R. P. (2004). Negative emotional reactions to challenging behaviour and staff burnout: Two replication studies. Journal of Applied Research in Intellectual Disabilities, 17(3), 219–223.
 Horne, S., & Zimmer-Gembeck, M. J. (2005). Female sexual subjectivity and well-being: Comparing late adolescents with different sexual experiences. Sexuality Research and Social Policy, 2(3), 25–40.
 Horne, S. (1999). Domestic violence in Russia. American Psychologist, 54(1), 55.
 Horne, S., & Zimmer-Gembeck, M. J. (2006). The female sexual subjectivity inventory: Development and validation of a multidimensional inventory for late adolescents and emerging adults. Psychology of Women Quarterly, 30(2), 125–138.
 Levitt, H. M., Ovrebo, E., Anderson-Cleveland, M. B., Leone, C., Jeong, J. Y., Arm, J. R., ... & Vardaman, J. M. (2009). Balancing dangers: GLBT experience in a time of anti-GLBT legislation. Journal of Counseling Psychology, 56(1), 67.
 Levitt, H. M., & Horne, S. G. (2002). Explorations of lesbian-queer genders: Butch, femme, androgynous or “other”. Journal of Lesbian Studies, 6(2), 25–39.

References

External links 
 Faculty Profile

American women psychologists
University of Massachusetts Boston faculty
Year of birth missing (living people)
Indiana University alumni
University of Georgia alumni
American women academics